Bosnia and Herzegovina competed at the 2019 World Aquatics Championships in Gwangju, South Korea from 12 to 28 July.

Swimming

Bosnia and Herzegovina entered four swimmers.

Men

Women

References

Nations at the 2019 World Aquatics Championships
Bosnia and Herzegovina at the World Aquatics Championships
2019 in Bosnia and Herzegovina sport